Simeon Farr was an American politician who was elected as a state representative in 1868 in South Carolina during the Reconstruction era. He represented Union County, South Carolina. His photograph was used in a composite of Radical Republican officials from South Carolina. His name is spelled Simon Farr in an 1868 House document.

Farr was white. Farr's fellow legislators from Union County in the House, Samuel Nuckles and June Mobley were African American. Nuckles gave testimony about intimidation that went on during the 1870 election.

See also
List of African-American officeholders during Reconstruction

References

Year of birth missing (living people)
Living people